Heathrow Connect was a train service in London provided jointly by Heathrow Express and Great Western Railway (GWR), between Paddington station and Heathrow Airport. The service followed the same route as the non-stop Heathrow Express service but called at certain intermediate stations, connecting several locations in West London with each other, the airport, and Central London. It ran every half-hour throughout the day and evening. The service was launched on 12 June 2005 and ceased on 19 May 2018, when it was absorbed into the TfL Rail concession, in advance of becoming part of the Elizabeth line once it opened on 24 May 2022.

History
In the late 1990s, British Airports Authority (BAA) built an airport rail link from Heathrow Airport to London Paddington station. This opened in June 1998, with non-stop Heathrow Express trains taking just 15minutes between Heathrow and Paddington.

In 2004, First Great Western Link and BAA (the operators of Heathrow Express) planned a stopping service between Heathrow and Paddington, using train paths previously occupied by stopping services from Slough. BAA spent £35million on the project, including the purchase of five new Siemens Desiro Class 360 trains.

In June 2005, the Heathrow Connect branded stopping service between Heathrow and Paddington was launched. Although cheaper than Heathrow Express, the journey took around 25minutes from Paddington, and ran less frequently. One benefit of the new service was that residents of West London (including airport staff) could reach the airport without needing to backtrack via Paddington. Trains were owned and operated by Heathrow Airport Holdings through Heathrow Express. 

From the opening of Heathrow Terminal 5 in 2008, Heathrow Connect provided a shuttle service between Heathrow Central and Terminal 4 to connect with Heathrow Express.

In May 2018, Heathrow Connect service were absorbed into TfL Rail ahead of the new Crossrail project. In May 2022, TfL Rail services were rebranded as the Elizabeth line, with through trains running through central London from November 2022. Heathrow Express services will continue to terminate at London Paddington.

Company

Structure
Heathrow Connect had a complex operating structure: Heathrow Airport Holdings (formerly BAA) supplied the rolling stock and on-board staff through its Heathrow Express subsidiary, and owned the track from Airport Junction to the terminals. GWR collected the revenue for journeys between Paddington and Hayes & Harlington, while Heathrow Airport Holdings collected the revenue for journeys between Hayes & Harlington and Heathrow.

Fares
Fares between Paddington and Hayes & Harlington were the same as for GWR services, but the single fare between Hayes and Heathrow was £6.30 . Oyster cards, Travelcards and Freedom Passes were not valid between Hayes & Harlington and Heathrow, but could be used throughout the rest of the route. When the service was first introduced in 2005, the fare for the  journey from Hayes to Heathrow was £6, which at £2 per mile made it one of the most expensive train journeys in the world.

The service was designed principally for the use of airport staff and West London residents for travel to Heathrow or Paddington. With a staff ID card, discounted fares were available for the journey between Hayes and Heathrow.

Heathrow Connect was marketed as a cheaper way to reach Paddington from Heathrow and vice versa, with a single fare of £10.30 (less than half the Heathrow Express fare, but almost double the price of a London Underground journey) and a journey time of 25minutes against the Express time of15 minutes. Passengers were also permitted to use their Railcards to access discounts. Originally it was not intended to be used as a cheaper (but slower) alternative to the Heathrow Express service from Paddington to Heathrow: every Connect service was overtaken by an Express service en route, and at Paddington trains were originally advertised on departure boards as running to Hayes & Harlington only. Standard-class travel between Heathrow Airport terminals was free, and this included Heathrow Connect services.

Operations

Route

Heathrow Connect used the relief lines of the Great Western Main Line between Paddington and Airport Junction, replacing some stopping services operated by First Great Western Link. As part of the original Heathrow Express project, these lines were electrified at  overhead as a diversionary route, and feature Automatic Train Protection. An additional flyover bridge was built in 2008 as part of Crossrail works to enable trains to enter or leave the airport spur without crossing any of the Great Western Main Line tracks.

Services initially terminated at Heathrow Central. Following Heathrow Express services being diverted to Terminal 5, from March 2008 Heathrow Connect services were extended to Terminal 4.

The service pattern, was as follows:
In early mornings and late evenings, some Heathrow Connect services were extended beyond Heathrow Central to either Terminal 4 or Terminal 5.
 On Sundays, all Heathrow Connect services were extended to Terminal 4, but did not call at West Ealing or Hanwell. Service frequency was also reduced from half-hourly to hourly.

Rolling stock
Heathrow Connect used five-car  electric multiple units. Four were built by Siemens Mobility in Krefeld, Germany for Angel Trains as demonstrator Desiros. One was brought to Northampton Kings Heath Siemens Depot in 2002 before South West Trains' Class 450s were delivered. The others were used at the Wildenrath Test Centre.

All four were purchased by Heathrow Connect and rebuilt before being sent to England. A fifth five-car set was delivered in November 2005, but did not enter service until December 2006. A fifth carriage was added to the original four four-car sets in 2006.

Replacement by TfL Rail

On 20 May 2018, TfL Rail took over the services operated by Heathrow Connect as a precursor to the full opening of the Elizabeth line, which at that time was expected to take place in December 2018.

Fares on the service were integrated into the TfL fare scheme, and therefore matched the fare scheme of London Underground services, with the exception of a premium for single journeys to and from Heathrow using Pay As You Go (Oyster and contactless). Passengers are able to use Oyster cards, Travelcards and Freedom Passes to travel between Hayes & Harlington and Heathrow.

TfL Rail had originally planned to replace the Class 360 units with Class 345s, but due to delays with the signalling system in the Heathrow Airport tunnels and late delivery of Class 345 units, a contingency plan was implemented. The Class 360s were used between London Paddington and Heathrow, supplemented by two Class 345 trains per hour running between London Paddington and the extended bay platform at Hayes & Harlington, until enough Class 345s were delivered. The Class 360s were fully replaced in September 2020.

For the eventual opening of the core of the Elizabeth line in May 2022, the service was given Elizabeth line branding and train paths were extended via the new tunnels at Paddington through Central London, calling at stations such as Bond Street, Liverpool Street and Canary Wharf to Abbey Wood. When the line opens fully, eastbound trains from Heathrow will terminate at Shenfield or Abbey Wood.

References

Airport rail links in London
Defunct train operating companies
Railway operators in London
Transport in the London Borough of Ealing
Transport in the London Borough of Hillingdon
Railway services introduced in 2005
Railway services discontinued in 2018
Connect Heathrow Connect
2005 establishments in England
2018 disestablishments in England